John Lunn (born 13 May 1956) is an Emmy Award winning Scottish composer, known for the music of the series Downton Abbey and many other television and movie soundtracks.

Early life and education 
Lunn was born in May 1956. His father was a saxophone player in a jazz band. 

Lunn graduated from Glasgow University, where he studied 12-tone techniques. He has cited among his musical influences John Cage,  Milton Babbit, and György Ligeti, as well as Miles Davis. Lunn was also a member of "systems music" band Man Jumping, an early 1980s "jazz-pop-worldbeat fusion ensemble", where he played bass and keyboard.".

He took a short course in computer music at MIT, and assembled his own computerised compositional system. He first used a Maselec MLA-2 tri-band compressor, with a Prism Sound ADA-8XR multichannel converter and an Orpheus FireWire interface, before settling on a Maselec MEA-2 analogue equaliser.

Career

Television 
He began composing for BBC Scotland in the late 1980s, with Beatrix: The Early Life of Beatrix Potter (1990) and The Gift (1991). His work also includes music for the television series Hamish Macbeth (1995-1997), Lorna Doone (2000), North Square (2000), Cambridge Spies (2003), Bleak House (2005), Hotel Babylon (2006), Little Dorrit (2008), Downton Abbey (2010-2015), Waking the Dead (2011), The White Queen (2013), Shetland (2013), Grantchester (2014), The Last Kingdom (2015), and Belgravia (2020).

Opera
He has written several operas. Two of them, Misper (1997) and Zoë (2000) (shown by Channel 4), were written for Glyndebourne. Another, Mathematics of a Kiss, was written for the English National Opera. He wrote the 2006 operetta Tangier Tattoo, with librettist Stephen Plaice, again for Glyndebourne.

Lunn's violin concerto was premiered by Clio Gould and the London Sinfonietta at the Queen Elizabeth Hall.

Albums published 
 (audio CD)

 (audio CD)

Awards 
Lunn has  won two Emmy Awards, in 2012  and 2013, both for the Outstanding Music Composition for A Series (Original Dramatic Score), each for an episode of Downton Abbey. He was nominated three other times: Outstanding Music Composition For A Miniseries, Movie Or A Special (Original Dramatic Score) for Little Dorrit in 2009;  for Outstanding Music Composition for A Series (Original Dramatic Score), for Downton Abbey, Episode 8 in 2014; and Outstanding Music Composition for a Miniseries, Movie or a Special (Original Dramatic Score) for The White Queen in 2014.

His music for Sky TV's Going Postal was winner of Best TV Score in the 2010 RTS Awards and was nominated for a BAFTA and an Ivor Novello award. The BBC adaptation of Dickens' Little Dorrit was nominated for a BAFTA Award for Outstanding Original Score.

References

External links
 
 John Lunn on Pop Music, Minimalism, and Composing for Downton Abbey

1956 births
British television composers
Living people
Scottish classical composers
Scottish opera composers
Male opera composers